Howard Joseph Price (20 September 1928 – 30 October 1992) was a Welsh cricketer.

Price made his debut in minor counties cricket for Lincolnshire against the Yorkshire Second XI in the 1960 Minor Counties Championship. He played minor counties cricket for Lincolnshire until 1975, making a total of 87 appearances in the Minor Counties Championship. During this time he played two List A matches for Lincolnshire. The first came against Northumberland at Jesmond in the 1st round of the 1971 Gillette Cup, with the second coming against Warwickshire in the second round of the same competition at Edgbaston.

He died at Moulton, Lincolnshire in October 1992.

References

External links

1928 births
1992 deaths
Sportspeople from Tredegar
Cricketers from Blaenau Gwent
Welsh cricketers
Lincolnshire cricketers